Abraham Lincoln "Link" Artz (March 26, 1865 – January 2, 1916) was an American football player and coach. He was an 1888 graduate of Dartmouth College in Hanover, New Hampshire. He played lettered as a halfback for the Dartmouth football team in 1886 and 1887. Artz served as the head football coach at Otterbein University in 1891, compiling a record of 2–1. His tenure included a season-opening victory over Ohio State.

References

External links
 

1865 births
1916 deaths
19th-century players of American football
American football halfbacks
Dartmouth Big Green football players
Otterbein Cardinals football coaches
People from Germantown, Ohio
Players of American football from Ohio